The Southerner was a streamlined passenger train operated by the Southern Railway in the United States between New York City and New Orleans via Charlotte, Atlanta and Birmingham. It operated from 1941 to 1970.

History
The Southerner was one of two new streamliners put into operation by the Southern Railway in 1941, the other being the Tennessean. The new train made its first run on March 31, 1941, using new equipment delivered by Pullman-Standard. The Pennsylvania Railroad handled the train between New York and Washington, D.C.

The Southerner shared much of the same route as the Crescent, the Southern's other major New York-New Orleans sleeper, but diverged between Atlanta and New Orleans. While the Crescent took a more direct route via Montgomery and Mobile, Alabama, the Southerner stayed inland to serve Birmingham. The Southerner also traveled exclusively on Southern trackage south of Washington, while the Crescent used Atlanta and West Point Railroad, Western Railway of Alabama and Louisville and Nashville Railroad trackage south of Atlanta.

In 1970, the Southern Railway combined the Crescent with the Southerner to form the Southern Crescent. The merged train moved to the Birmingham route, allowing the train to run solely on Southern's right-of-way between New Orleans and Washington. This train became Amtrak's Crescent on February 1, 1979.

Equipment
Pullman-Standard built three consists in 1941 for the new Southerner streamliner. Each consist included the following: baggage-dormitory-coach (22 seats), 52-seat coach (partitioned because of segregationist policies in the Southern United States), 56-seat coach, a dining car, two more 56-seat coaches, and a tavern-lounge-observation car. The front half of the observation car contained a tavern area with booths and tables. A bar area with a small buffet followed, then a rounded-off observation area. The Pennsylvania Railroad owned three of the 56-seat coaches. Motive power south of Washington, D.C. was provided by an EMD E6 diesel locomotive.

References

External links
Terminal Station, at 1125 Canal Street, New Orleans
Southerner 1948 at Tuscaloosa, Alabama
Streamliners to the Palms 
July, 1952 Southern Railway timetable

Named passenger trains of the United States
Night trains of the United States
Passenger trains of the Southern Railway (U.S.)
Transportation in New Orleans
Railway services introduced in 1941
Railway services discontinued in 1970
Passenger rail transportation in Alabama
Passenger rail transportation in Georgia (U.S. state)
Passenger rail transportation in Louisiana
Passenger rail transportation in Mississippi
Passenger rail transportation in North Carolina
Passenger rail transportation in South Carolina
Passenger rail transportation in Virginia